State Road 845 (SR 845), locally known as Powerline Road, is a  north–south divided highway serving northern Broward County and southern Palm Beach County, Florida, U.S.A. The route extends from an intersection with Sunrise Boulevard (SR 838) near downtown Ft. Lauderdale, north to an intersection with Glades Road (SR 808) near Boca Raton.

Like Military Trail (State Road 809) to the east, State Road 845 is a major commuter highway paralleling Florida's Turnpike (State Road 91) and Interstate 95 (State Road 9) and often used as an alternative for the often-congested expressways.  The road received its name from the parallel high tension power lines for almost its entire length.

Route description
SR 845 begins at an intersection with SR 838 (Sunrise Boulevard) in the city of Fort Lauderdale. SR 845 runs north along Powerline Road (NW 9th Avenue). The route is a four-lane road until the intersection with NW 13th Street, where it becomes six lanes. Crossing the South Fork Middle River, SR 845 crosses into Wilton Manors. Soon the road crosses into Oakland Park, where it reaches an intersection with SR 816 (Oakland Park Boulevard). A block west of SR 845 is an interchange with Interstate 95 (I-95) at exit 31. After crossing NW 40th Street, SR 845 crosses under I-95 and begins to parallel the freeway. The route crosses and parallels Tri-Rail tracks.

Crossing back into Fort Lauderdale, SR 845 reaches a junction with FL 870 (Commercial Boulevard). Just east of the intersection is exit 32 on I-95 and reaches an intersection with NW 59th Court, which connects to the Cypress Creek station of Tri-Rail. Soon SR 845 reaches Cypress Creek Road (County Road 840), which connects to exit 33. The route passes west of Pompano Park Racetrack in Pompano Park. Crossing into Pompano Beach, SR 845 crosses SR 814 (Atlantic Boulevard). Continuing north, SR 845 crosses into Deerfield Beach and reaches a junction with SR 834 (Sample Road). Later, the road crosses at-grade with SR 869 (NW 10th Street), which connects to the Sawgrass Expressway, a toll road.

Reaching Butler's Corner, SR 845 reaches a junction with SR 810 (Hillsboro Boulevard). SR 810 is the last major junction in Deerfield Beach as the road crosses into Palm Beach County. Now in Boca Raton, the route continues north and reaches Palmetto Park Road (CR 798). After CR 798, the route bends northeast and soon northward to a junction with SR 808 (Glades Road). The junction with SR 808 marks the northern terminus of SR 845 and Powerline Road. Powerline continues north as Jog Road, which crosses through Palm Beach County.

History 
On 19 December 2017, the Palm Beach County Board of Commissioners approved a transfer agreement to submit to the Florida Department of Transportation. The agreement relinquished the portion of SR 845 in Palm Beach County to county maintenance, relocating its northern terminus to the Broward-Palm Beach County line at the bridge over the Hillsboro Canal.

Major intersections

References

External links 

845
845
845
Deerfield Beach, Florida